Brett Smith (born 11 May 1992) is a British racing driver currently competing in the Mini Challenge UK and the British Touring Car Championship for Eurotech Racing.

British Touring Car Championship

He joined the series from the Snetterton round in July replacing his father, Jeff who was injured in a crash during the qualifying session for the previous round at Croft.

Racing record

Career summary

Complete British Touring Car Championship results
(key) (Races in bold indicate pole position – 1 point awarded just in first race; races in italics indicate fastest lap – 1 point awarded all races; * signifies that driver led race for at least one lap – 1 point given all races)

References

1992 births
Living people
British Touring Car Championship drivers
Renault UK Clio Cup drivers
Mini Challenge UK drivers